Idan Schefler (born January 1, 1984) is an Israeli footballer from Shikun Vatikim Ramat Gan. Considered one of Ramat Gan's up and coming talents, he was nearly sold before the 2006-2007 season to national powerhouse, Beitar Jerusalem, but failed to impress during his trial. His trial period started at the club's training grounds and he was even brought to the club's preseason camp in Arnhem, Netherlands.

Footnotes

External links
 Profile of Idan Schefler on Boston College Eagles' official website

1984 births
Living people
Israeli Jews
Israeli footballers
Footballers from Ramat Gan
Hapoel Ramat Gan F.C. players
Boston College Eagles men's soccer players
Hapoel Kiryat Ono F.C. players
Israeli expatriate footballers
Expatriate soccer players in the United States
Israeli expatriate sportspeople in the United States
Liga Leumit players
Association football defenders